Rade Đokić (born 23 June 1983) is a Bosnian-Herzegovinian footballer who last played for SK Vorwärts Steyr.

Club career
Born in Zvornik, SR Bosnia and Herzegovina, Ðokić started his career at FK Drina Zvornik before moving to Serbia where he represented FK Kabel, FK Srem and FK Zvezdara.  He was playing in the youth team of FK Kabel when he debuted for the first team in the season 1999–2000 of the Second League of FR Yugoslavia when being only 16 years old.

In 2005, he moved to Austria where, after spending one year with Kapfenberger SV, in summer of 2006 he joined Grazer AK, where he partnered with countryman Samir Muratović.  He will also play with SV Ried, 1. FC Vöcklabruck, Austria Wien II and First Vienna FC, before leaving Austria and joining Kazakhstan Premier League side FC Sunkar in summer 2012.

References

1983 births
Living people
People from Zvornik
Serbs of Bosnia and Herzegovina
Association football forwards
Bosnia and Herzegovina footballers
FK Drina Zvornik players
FK Kabel players
FK Srem players
FK Zvezdara players
Kapfenberger SV players
Grazer AK players
SV Ried players
1. FC Vöcklabruck players
First Vienna FC players
FC Sunkar players
Wiener Sport-Club players
SK Vorwärts Steyr players
Austrian Football Bundesliga players
2. Liga (Austria) players
Bosnia and Herzegovina expatriate footballers
Expatriate footballers in Serbia and Montenegro
Bosnia and Herzegovina expatriate sportspeople in Serbia and Montenegro
Expatriate footballers in Austria
Bosnia and Herzegovina expatriate sportspeople in Austria
Expatriate footballers in Kazakhstan
Bosnia and Herzegovina expatriate sportspeople in Kazakhstan